"I Do It" is a song by American rapper Lil Wayne featuring American rappers Big Sean and Lil Baby, from Wayne's thirteenth studio album Funeral (2020). The song peaked at number 33 on the Billboard Hot 100, making Lil Wayne the artist with the second-most top 40 hits, being his 82nd.

Background 
Lil Wayne first announced his collaboration with Lil Baby and the process of working with him in a July 2019 interview with XXL.

The song was released as the lead single from Lil Wayne's thirteenth studio album Funeral on January 31, 2020. Three hours before it was officially released, Wayne posted a snippet of the track on Instagram.

Charts

References 

2020 singles
2020 songs
Lil Wayne songs
Big Sean songs
Lil Baby songs
Songs written by Lil Wayne
Songs written by Big Sean
Songs written by Lil Baby
Trap music songs
Young Money Entertainment singles
Republic Records singles